The 2021 SWAC men's basketball tournament (officially known as the Cricket Wireless SWAC Basketball Tournament due to sponsorship reasons) was the postseason men's basketball tournament for the 2020–21 season in the Southwestern Athletic Conference (SWAC). The tournament was held from March 10–13, 2021. The tournament winner received an automatic invitation to the 2021 NCAA Division I men's basketball tournament.

Seeds
Teams were seeded by record within the conference, with a tie–breaker system to seed teams with identical conference records. Only the top eight teams in the conference qualified for the tournament. Both Alabama State and Alabama A&M are currently ineligible for postseason play per SWAC regulations.

Schedule

Source

Bracket

* denotes overtime period</onlyinclude>

See also
2021 SWAC women's basketball tournament
SWAC men's basketball tournament

References

Tournament
SWAC men's basketball tournament
Basketball competitions in Birmingham, Alabama
College sports tournaments in Alabama
MEAC men's basketball tournament
MEAC men's basketball tournament